Altair Radioss is a multidisciplinary finite element solver developed by Altair Engineering. It can solve both linear and non-linear problems. It is a finite element solver using implicit and explicit integration schemes for the solution of engineering problems, from linear statics and linear dynamics to nonlinear transient dynamics and mechanical systems. This multidisciplinary solver enables designers to maximize performance related to durability, NVH, crash, safety, manufacturability, and fluid-structure interaction, in order to bring products to market faster. 

Since the 2021 release, Radioss has supported input in the LS-DYNA input format as well as the Radioss 'Block' Format 

OpenRadioss, an open source version of Radioss, sharing the capabilities, input and output formats of Altair Radioss, was released on September the 8th 2022.

Disciplines 

 Linear static analysis
 Non-linear explicit dynamic analysis
 Non-linear implicit quasi-static analysis
 Normal modes analysis for real and complex eigenvalues
 Linear buckling analysis
 Frequency response analysis
 Random response analysis
 Linear transient response analysis
 Linear coupled fluid-structure (acoustic) analysis
 Linear steady-state heat transfer analysis coupled with static analysis
 Explicit Arbitrary Eulerian-Lagrangian (ALE) formulation
 Explicit Computational Fluid Dynamics (CFD)
 Smoothed-particle hydrodynamics (SPH)
 One-step (inverse) and incremental sheet metal stamping analysis

References

External links 
 Altair Radioss webpage
 Altair Radioss User Documentation
 OpenRadioss webpage

Finite element software
Simulation software
Finite element software for Linux